The thallium halides include monohalides, where thallium has oxidation state +1, trihalides in which thallium generally has oxidation state +3, and some intermediate halides containing thallium with mixed +1 and +3 oxidation states. These materials find use in specialized optical settings, such as focusing elements in research spectrophotometers. Compared to the more common zinc selenide-based optics, materials such as thallium bromoiodide enable transmission at longer wavelengths. In the infrared, this allows for measurements as low as 350 cm−1 (28 μm), whereas zinc selenide is opaque by 21.5 μm, and ZnSe optics are generally only usable to 650 cm−1 (15 μm).

Monohalides

The monohalides all contain thallium with oxidation state +1. Parallels can be drawn between the thallium(I) halides and their corresponding silver salts; for example, thallium(I) chloride and bromide are light-sensitive, and thallium(I) fluoride is more soluble in water than the chloride and bromide.

Thallium(I) fluoride
TlF is a white crystalline solid, with a mp of 322 °C. It is readily soluble in water unlike the other Tl(I) halides. The normal room-temperature form has a similar structure to α-PbO which has a distorted rock salt structure with essentially five coordinate thallium, the sixth fluoride ion is at 370 pm. At 62 °C it transforms to a tetragonal structure. This structure is unchanged up to pressure of 40 GPa.
The room temperature structure has been explained in terms of interaction between Tl 6s and the F 2p states producing strongly antibonding Tl-F states. The structure distorts to minimise these unfavourable covalent interactions.

Thallium(I) chloride
TlCl is a light sensitive, white crystalline solid, mp 430 °C. The crystal structure is the same as CsCl.
Thallium(I) bromide
TlBr is a light sensitive, pale yellow crystalline solid, mp 460 °C. The crystal structure is the same as CsCl.

Thallium(I) iodide
At room temperature, TlI is a yellow crystalline solid, mp 442 °C. The crystal structure is a distorted rock salt structure known as the β-TlI structure. At higher temperatures the colour changes to red with a structure the same as CsCl.

Thallium(I) mixed halides

Thallium bromoiodide / thallium bromide iodide and thallium bromochloride / thallium bromide chloride are mixed salts of thallium(I) that are used in spectroscopy as an optical material for transmission, refraction, and focusing of infrared radiation. The materials were first grown by R. Koops in the laboratory of Olexander Smakula at the Carl Zeiss Optical Works, Jena in 1941. The red bromoiodide was coded KRS-5 and the colourless bromochloride, KRS-6 and this is how they are commonly known. The KRS prefix is an abbreviation of "Kristalle aus dem Schmelz-fluss", (crystals from the melt). KRS-5 is the most commonly used, its properties of being relatively insoluble in water and non-hygroscopic, make it an alternative to KBr, CsI, and AgCl.

Trihalides
The thallium trihalides are less stable than their corresponding aluminium, gallium, and indium counterparts and chemically quite distinct. The triiodide does not contain thallium with oxidation state +3 but is a thallium(I) compound and contains the linear  ion.

Thallium(III) fluoride
In this the thallium atom is 9 coordinate (tricapped trigonal prismatic). It can be synthesised by fluoridation of the oxide, Tl2O3, with F2, BrF3, or SF4 at 300 °C.

Thallium(III) chloride
Solid  is unstable and disproportionates at 40 °C, losing chlorine to give .

Thallium(III) bromide
This unstable compound disproportionates at less than 40 °C to TlBr2. It can be prepared in CH3CN by treating a solution of TlBr with Br2 gas. In water the tetrahydrate complex can be prepared by adding bromine to a stirred suspension of TlBr.

Thallium(I) triiodide
It does not contain thallium(III), but has the same structure as  containing the linear  ion.

Mixed-valence halides
As a group, these are not well characterised. They contain both Tl(I) and Tl(III), where the thallium(III) atom is present as complex anions, e.g. .

This yellow compound is formulated .

This pale brown solid is formulated 

The structure is not known.

Halide complexes
Thallium(I) complexes
Thallium(I) can form complexes of the type  and  both in solution and when thallium(I) halides are incorporated into alkali metal halides. These doped alkali metal halides have new absorption and emission nbands and are used as phosphors in scintillation radiation detectors.

Thallium(III) fluoride complexes
The salts  and  do not contain discrete tetrahedral and octahedral anions. Na3TlF6 has the same structure as cryolite, . In this the thallium atoms are octahedrally coordinated.

Thallium(III) chloride complexes
Salts of tetrahedral  and octahedral  are known with various cations.

Salts containing  with a square pyramidal structure are known.

The ion , where thallium atoms are octahedrally coordinated with three bridging chlorine atoms, has been identified in the caesium salt, .

Thallium(III) bromide complexes

The  anion has been characterised in a number of salts and is trigonal bipyramidal.

Thallium(III) iodide complexes
The  anion is stable even though the triiodide is a thallium(I) compound.

References

Further information

Metal halides
Mixed valence compounds
Thallium compounds